Mark Lawson may refer to:

 Mark Lawson (born 1962), English journalist, broadcaster and author
 Mark Lawson (actor) (born 1979), American actor
 Mark Lawson (cricketer) (born 1985), English cricketer
 Mark Lawson (footballer) (born 1962), Australian rules footballer
 Mark Lawson (rugby union) (born 1980), Canadian rugby union player
 Mark Lawson (politician), member of the Oklahoma House of Representatives